NKB may refer to:

Neurokinin B, a neuropeptide
Dutch Korfball Association, former name of the Royal Dutch Korfball Association
National Royalist Movement, a Belgian resistance group in World War II
People's Commissariat of Munitions, in the USSR
the ISO 639-3 language code for Khoibu language, a language spoken in India
the IATA code for Noonkanbah Airport in Australia, in List of airports in Australia